Paleonelsonia is a fossil genus of trilobites belonging to the family Ptychopariidae.

References

Ptychopariida genera
Ptychopariidae